The 2010 Trani Cup was a professional tennis tournament played on outdoor red clay courts. It was the eighth edition of the tournament which was part of the 2010 ATP Challenger Tour. It took place in Trani, Italy between 9 and 15 August 2010.

Singles main draw entrants

Seeds

 Rankings are as of August 2, 2010.

Other entrants
The following players received wildcards into the singles main draw:
  Francesco Aldi
  Andrea Arnaboldi
  Matteo Trevisan
  Matteo Viola

The following players received entry from the qualifying draw:
  Thomas Cazes-Carrère
  Nikola Ćirić
  Patrick Taubert
  Marco Viola

Champions

Singles

 Jesse Huta Galung def.  Filippo Volandri, 7–6(3), 6–4

Doubles

 Thomas Fabbiano /  Matteo Trevisan def.  Daniele Bracciali /  Filippo Volandri, 6–2, 7–5

External links
ITF search 
2010 Draws

Trani Cup
Clay court tennis tournaments
Trani Cup